Li Jiaqi (Chinese: 李佳奇; born 18 June 1991 in Harbin) is a Chinese football player who currently plays for China League One side Guizhou Zhicheng.

Club career
In 2009, Li Jiaqi started his professional footballer career with Shenzhen Ruby in the Chinese Super League. He would eventually make his league debut for Shenzhen on 8 May 2011 in a game against Guangzhou Evergrande.
In 2012, he was loaned to China League Two side Shenzhen Main Sports until 31 December.

In January 2014, Li transferred to China League Two side Guizhou Zhicheng.

Career statistics 
Statistics accurate as of match played 1 November 2015

References

1991 births
Living people
Chinese footballers
Footballers from Harbin
Shenzhen F.C. players
Guangdong Sunray Cave players
Guizhou F.C. players
Chinese Super League players
China League One players
Association football midfielders